Gangai Karai Paattu is a 1995 Tamil language drama film directed by Manivannan. The film stars Varun Raj and Roopa Sri. It was released on 3 February 1995.

Plot synopsis
Ganga moves from Mumbai to Yercaud with her grandfather and Raja falls in love with her but she is haunted by her past. Later when it is disclosed that she has committed a murder, Raja decides to stand by her.

Cast
 Varun Raj
Roopa Sri
 Nizhalgal Ravi
 Manivannan
 Janagaraj
 Mansoor Ali Khan
 Kovai Sarala
 Delhi Ganesh
 Manobala
 Madurai Vasu

Soundtrack
The music was composed by Deva and lyrics were written by Kalidasan.

References

1995 films
1990s Tamil-language films
Films scored by Deva (composer)
Films directed by Manivannan